The Warlord Era was a historical period of the Republic of China that began from 1916 and lasted until the mid-1930s, during which the country was divided and ruled by various military cliques following the death of Yuan Shikai in 1916. Communist revolution broke out in the later part of the warlord period, beginning the Chinese Civil War. The era nominally ended in 1928 at the conclusion of the Northern Expedition with the Northeast Flag Replacement, beginning the "Nanjing decade".  However, "residual warlords" continued to exist into the 1930s under de jure Kuomintang rule, and remained until the end of the Communist victory in 1949.

The warlords and military cliques of the Warlord Era are generally divided into the Northern factions and the Southern factions. The following is a list of cliques within each faction, and the dominant warlords within that clique.

Northern factions
The cliques in the North emerged from the fragmentation of the Beiyang Government/Army. Most of them were generals under Yuan Shikai. After the death of Yuan, they separated and formed cliques in their own sphere of influence.

Anhui clique
The Anhui clique was so named because many of its most influential members were from Anhui, including founder Duan Qirui. It had a affiliated political party, the Anfu club, and a financial wing, the New Communications clique, under Deputy Foreign Minister Cao Rulin.

The clique had close ties to Japan, granting heavy concessions in exchange for funding and military training, and advocated war against the German Empire as part of the First World War, as well as military suppression of the Kuomintang.

The clique was removed from power after the Zhili–Anhui War and slowly faded from prominence.

Zhili clique
Zhili was the province surrounding Beijing, now the province of Hebei.

The Zhili clique was formed by officers disgruntled with the Anhui clique and rallied around Feng Guozhang. It was aligned to Western powers.

The clique took power after the Zhili–Anhui War but lost it after the Second Zhili–Fengtian War.

It was largely wiped out during the Northern Expedition.

Fengtian clique
Fengtian is the former name of Liaoning province, and was the political center of Manchuria.

The Fengtian clique controlled most of Manchuria up to Shanhai Pass and had a close relationship with Japan. Its civilian branch was the Communications Clique, under Premier Liang Shiyi.

It took power in Beijing after the Second Zhili–Fengtian War but could not stop the Kuomintang during the Northern Expedition, and was driven from Manchuria after the Mukden Incident and merged with the Kuomintang.

Shanxi clique
Formed in the aftermath of the Xinhai Revolution, the Shanxi clique was limited to Shanxi province only.

Although affiliated with the Anhui clique, Yan Xishan remained neutral until the Northern Expedition, during which he sided with the Kuomintang.

Guominjun
Also known as the Northwestern Army, it was formed from disgruntled Zhili clique officers during the Second Zhili–Fengtian War, through the Beijing Coup.

Although originally sympathetic to the Kuomintang, it rebelled in the 1930 Central Plains War and was defeated. It was aligned to the Soviet Union.

Ma clique
The "Three Mas of the Northwest" or "Xibei San Ma" originated in the Kansu Braves militia formed during the Dungan revolt. All Ma Clique Generals were Hui Chinese Muslim Kuomintang members. The Ma Clique Fought against the Guominjun during the Central Plains War, and attempted to destroy the Xinjiang clique during the Kumul Rebellion but were defeated by Soviet Red Army intervention.

Xinjiang clique
Under Yang Zengxin, the clique organized the defence against the Soviet encroachment, but later closely affiliated with the Soviet Union.

Manchu Restorationists 
In July 1917 a clique of generals and officials were able to conquer and occupy Beijing, temporarily restoring the deposed child emperor Puyi for a little over a week.

Southern factions
The military cliques in the South are generally regional revolutionary leaders that took over after the fall of Qing dynasty in Xinhai Revolution.

Kuomintang
The Nationalist Party of China, derived from the Tongmenghui revolutionary organization, it established a rival government of the Republic of China in Guangzhou, Guangdong Province in the 1913 Second Revolution and in the 1917 Constitutional Protection War. Its military arm was the National Revolutionary Army.

The party nominally reunified China in 1928 after defeating most Northern factions during the Northern Expedition, governing the country from Nanjing.

Run as a Dang Guo (黨國), or Party-State, along the lines of the organisational principles of Leninism, the party's ideology was based on Socialism and Nationalism. Initially Soviet-backed, after the Shanghai massacre it allied with Germany.

Chinese Communist Party
The Chinese Communist Party, formed in 1921 in the aftermath of the May Fourth Movement. Its military arm eventually became the People's Liberation Army.

The party was allied with the Kuomintang during the first phase of the Northern Expedition, but the two sides split following the Shanghai massacre in 1927. The two parties would then fight a decades long civil war, which ended with the Kuomintang retreat to Taiwan and the founding of the People's Republic of China on the mainland.

Yunnan clique
The Yunnan Military Government was established on October 30, 1911, with Cai E elected as the military governor. This marked the beginning of the "Yunnan clique".

Guizhou warlords
Guizhou Province was dominated by a series of successive autonomous warlords.

Old Guangxi clique
Guangxi province announced its independence on November 6, 1911. Originally, the revolutionaries supported the Qing Governor to remain in position. However, he later left the province, and Lu Rongting succeeded his position.

New Guangxi clique
After the Guangdong–Guangxi War, the Old Guangxi clique was no longer effective, and was replaced by the New Guangxi clique. Supported the Kuomintang's Northern Expedition but rebelled during the Central Plains War.

Guangdong warlords
Guangdong was independent on November 8. The Guangdong Army was in the early 1920s mostly dominated by Chen Jiongming. In the 1930s, Chen Jitang was chairman of the government.

Sichuan clique
During the period from 1927 to 1938, Sichuan was in the hands of multiple warlords. No warlord had enough power to take on all the others at once, so many small battles occurred, pitting one warlord against another.

Hunan warlords
Hunan Province was ruled by successive autonomous warlords.

References

External links
 Rulers: Chinese Administrative divisions

 
 
 
China history-related lists
1910s in China
1920s in China
Military history of the Republic of China (1912–1949)